Aletes was a son of Hippotes, of Dorian ancestry,  and a fifth-generation descendant of Heracles.  He is said to have defeated in battle the Corinthians, taken possession of Corinth, and to have expelled the Sisyphids thirty years after the first invasion of the Peloponnesus by the Heraclids.  His family, sometimes called the Aletidae, maintained themselves at Corinth down to the time of Bacchis (that is, late 10th century BC). Velleius Paterculus calls him a descendant of Heracles, but of the sixth generation.  He received an oracle, promising him the sovereignty of Athens if during the war, which was then going on, its king should remain uninjured. This oracle became known at Athens, and the Athenian king Codrus sacrificed himself to preserve the city.

Notes

References

 Callimachus, Callimachus and Lycophron with an English translation by A. W. Mair ; Aratus, with an English translation by G. R. Mair, London: W. Heinemann, New York: G. P. Putnam 1921. Internet Archive
 Callimachus, Works. A.W. Mair. London: William Heinemann; New York: G.P. Putnam's Sons. 1921. Greek text available at the Perseus Digital Library.
 Conon, Fifty Narrations, surviving as one-paragraph summaries in the Bibliotheca (Library) of Photius, Patriarch of Constantinople translated from the Greek by Brady Kiesling. Online version at the Topos Text Project.
 Pausanias, Description of Greece with an English Translation by W.H.S. Jones, Litt.D., and H.A. Ormerod, M.A., in 4 Volumes. Cambridge, MA, Harvard University Press; London, William Heinemann Ltd. 1918. . Online version at the Perseus Digital Library
 Pausanias, Graeciae Descriptio. 3 vols. Leipzig, Teubner. 1903.  Greek text available at the Perseus Digital Library.
 Pindar, Odes translated by Diane Arnson Svarlien. 1990. Online version at the Perseus Digital Library.
 Pindar, The Odes of Pindar including the Principal Fragments with an Introduction and an English Translation by Sir John Sandys, Litt.D., FBA. Cambridge, MA., Harvard University Press; London, William Heinemann Ltd. 1937. Greek text available at the Perseus Digital Library.
 Strabo, The Geography of Strabo. Edition by H.L. Jones. Cambridge, Mass.: Harvard University Press; London: William Heinemann, Ltd. 1924. Online version at the Perseus Digital Library.
 Strabo, Geographica edited by A. Meineke. Leipzig: Teubner. 1877. Greek text available at the Perseus Digital Library.

Heracleidae
Kings of Corinth

Kings in Greek mythology
Corinthian characters in Greek mythology